is a Japanese football player.

Club statistics
Updated to end of 2018 season.

References

External links
Profile at Kagoshima United FC

1991 births
Living people
Association football people from Yamanashi Prefecture
Japanese footballers
J1 League players
J2 League players
J3 League players
FC Tokyo players
Kataller Toyama players
Kagoshima United FC players
Suzuka Point Getters players
Association football defenders